Ghasem Haddadifar (born July 12, 1983) is an Iranian footballer who played for Zob Ahan in the Iran Pro League. He was also member of the Iranian national team and represented Iran at the 2014 FIFA World Cup.

In 2015 Haddadifar was named Iranian footballer of the season for the 2014–15 Persian Gulf Pro League season with Zob Ahan.

Club career

Zob Ahan
Hadadifar joined Zob Ahan in 2003 after spending seven years with the club's youth teams. Haddadifar made his debut in the 2003–04 season making nine appearances and scoring once throughout his first season. The next year again Haddadifar played a minor role and mainly came on as a substitute in the season which Zob Ahan finished runners up in the league.

He has also been loaned out to Sanat Naft who played in the Azadegan League in 2005 to gain some experience and playing time. Haddadifar was a big part in Sanat Naft's successful season scoring twice in which the club finished third.

After returning to Zob Ahan in 2006 Haddadifar broke into the first team having an increasing role and helping Zob Ahan clinch an eight place finish. In the 2008–09 season Ghasem was Zob Ahan's best player scoring six times and leading Zob Ahan to another league runners-up and scoring twice in Zob Ahan's 5–2 Hazfi Cup final victory over Rah Ahan. The following season Haddadifar had continued success with Zob Ahan, again achieving a runners-up finish in the league. The same season with the help of Haddadifar goal in the semi-final against Al Hilal, Zob Ahan made the final of the AFC Champions League, becoming the second Iranian club to do so, but the club eventually lost to South Korean club Seongnam FC.

After struggling with injury in the 2011–12 season Haddadifar was loaned out to Tractor for the later half of the season. He helped Tractor achieve a runners-up finish and the club clinched an AFC Champions League spot for the first time in their history.

The following season after Haddadifar returned to Zob Ahan, the team had a poor season finishing in a relegation play-off, but the club managed to stay up after beating Pas Hamedan in a two-legged play-off. The 2013–14 season did not fare much better for Haddadifar or the club. Zob Ahan escaped relegation on goal difference after finishing thirteenth.

After the arrival of Yahya Golmohammadi as manager of Zob Ahan, both the club and Haddadifar were revived. Haddidifar had a stellar season, helping the club to win the Hazfi Cup again and earn a fourth-place finish in the league, which earned Zob Ahan a Champions League slot after a six-year absence. Haddidifar was recognized for his individual performances and was named to the 2014–15 Persian Gulf Pro League Team of the Year and was also recognized as the 2014–15 Persian Gulf Pro League Player of the Year.

Career Statistics

International career
In 2010, Hadadifar received his first cap for Iran in a friendly match against Armenia. On 1 June 2014, he was called into Iran's 2014 FIFA World Cup squad by Carlos Queiroz.

Honours

Club
Zob Ahan
AFC Champions League : 2010 Runner up
Persian Gulf Pro League : 2004–05 Runner up, 2008–09 Runner up, 2009–10 Runner up
Hazfi Cup (4) : 2002–03 , 2008–09 , 2014–15 , 2015–16
Iranian Super Cup (1) : 2016

Tractor
Persian Gulf Pro League : 2011–12 Runner up

Individual
Iranian Footballer of the Year : 2015
Persian Gulf Pro League Team of the Year : 2014–15

Personal life 
His father was an employee of Zob Ahan Isfahan Steel Company, and he was born in Zob Ahan Hospital. His brother Alireza is also a footballer and is his teammate.

References

External links 

1983 births
Living people
Zob Ahan Esfahan F.C. players
Iranian footballers
Iran international footballers
2011 AFC Asian Cup players
2014 FIFA World Cup players
Sanat Naft Abadan F.C. players
Persian Gulf Pro League players
Azadegan League players
Sportspeople from Isfahan
Association football midfielders